Samuel Stephens may refer to:
Samuel Stephens (senior) (1728–1794), Member of Parliament for St Ives 1751–1754
Samuel Stephens (junior) (c.1768–1834), Member of Parliament for St Ives 1806–1812 and 1818–1820, son of the above
Samuel Stephens (Colonial Manager) (1808–1840), first Colonial Manager (CEO) of the South Australian Company (1836–1837)
Samuel Stephens (New Zealand) (1803–1855), member of the New Zealand House of Representatives
Samuel Stephens (North Carolina governor) (1629–1669), Colonial Governor of North Carolina
Samuel Barron Stephens, (1814–1882), member of the Florida House of Representatives

See also
Samuel Stevens (disambiguation)